John R. Phillpot served as the International Commissioner of the Scout Association of the Bahamas.

Background
In 1986, Phillpot was awarded the 187th Bronze Wolf, the only distinction of the World Organization of the Scout Movement, awarded by the World Scout Committee for exceptional services to world Scouting.
He was also a recipient of the Silver World Award.

References

External links

Recipients of the Bronze Wolf Award
Year of birth missing
Scouting and Guiding in the Bahamas